The West Lions are a Rugby union club based in the Belconnen area of Canberra, Australian Capital Territory.

In 2005, Wests won grand finals across every grade.

The team's colours are Maroon and Blue.

Honours
WESTS LIONS (1962–present)
John I Dent Cup  – Premierships (13): 1969, 70, 73, 74, 75, 76, 78, 93, 96, 2000, 01, 02, 05.

See also

ACTRU Premier Division

References

External links
 Official website

Rugby union teams in the Australian Capital Territory
Rugby clubs established in 1962
1962 establishments in Australia